Live at the Theatre Boulogne-Billancourt/Paris, Vol. 2 is an album by Mingus Dynasty, billed as Big Band Charlie Mingus.

Recording and music
Live at the Theatre Boulogne-Billancourt/Paris, Vol. 2 was recorded on June 8, 1988. The band was billed as Big Band Charlie Mingus, a larger version of Mingus Dynasty, which plays the music of Charles Mingus. The performances were conducted by Jimmy Knepper.

The central piece is "The Black Saint and the Sinner Lady", that uses "Ellingtonian gestures: plunger mutes (including quotes from 'It Don't Mean a Thing, If It Ain't Got That Swing'); a wah-wah trombone and drums (Billy Hart) duet; a slow fugue section similar to Ellington's in 'A Tone Parallel to Harlem'; and a solo piano interlude (Jaki Byard).

Releases
The album was released by Soul Note. It was later included, with Live at the Theatre Boulogne-Billancourt/Paris, Vol. 1 and other albums, in the CAM Jazz 4-CD compilation Mingus Dynasty Big Band Charlie Mingus.

Track listing
"Boogie Stop Shuffle"
"My Jelly Roll Soul"
"The Black Saint and the Sinner Lady"
"Goodbye Pork Pie Hat"

Personnel
Nick Brignola – baritone sax, flute
Clifford Jordan – tenor sax, soprano sax
David Murray – tenor sax, bass clarinet
John Handy – alto sax
Randy Brecker – trumpet
Jon Faddis – cornet
Jimmy Knepper – trombone, conductor
Mike Zwerin – trombone
Jaki Byard – piano
Reggie Johnson – bass
Billy Hart – drums

References

1988 albums
Black Saint/Soul Note live albums
Charles Mingus tribute albums